Frederick George Hodges (8 May 1921 – 24 November 2014) was a British diver. He competed in the men's 3 metre springboard event at the 1936 Summer Olympics. He was Britain's youngest male Olympian until 2008. Hodges was aged fifteen years and ninety four days old when he competed in 1936.

References

1921 births
2014 deaths
British male divers
Olympic divers of Great Britain
Divers at the 1936 Summer Olympics